was the second shōgun of the Tokugawa dynasty, who ruled from 1605 until his abdication in 1623. He was the third son of Tokugawa Ieyasu, the first shōgun of the Tokugawa shogunate.

Early life (1579–1593)
Tokugawa Hidetada was born to Tokugawa Ieyasu and the Lady Saigō on May 2, 1581. This was shortly before Lady Tsukiyama, Ieyasu's official wife, and their son Tokugawa Nobuyasu were executed on suspicion of plotting to assassinate Oda Nobunaga, who was Nobuyasu's father-in-law and Ieyasu's ally. By killing his wife and son, Ieyasu declared his loyalty to Nobunaga. In 1589, Hidetada's mother fell ill, her health rapidly deteriorated, and she died at Sunpu Castle. Later Hidetada with his brother, Matsudaira Tadayoshi, was raised by Lady Achaa, one of Ieyasu's concubines.

The traditional power base of the Tokugawa clan was Mikawa. In 1590, the new ruler of Japan, Toyotomi Hideyoshi enlisted Tokugawa Ieyasu and others in attacking the domain of the Hōjō in what became known as the Siege of Odawara (1590). Hideyoshi enlisted Ieyasu for this campaign by promising to exchange the five provinces under Ieyasu's control for the eight Kantō provinces, including the city of Edo. In order to keep Ieyasu from defecting to the Hōjō side (since the Hōjō and the Tokugawa were formerly on friendly terms), Hideyoshi took the eleven-year-old Hidetada as a hostage. In 1592 Hideyoshi presided over Hidetada's coming of age ceremony; it was then that Ieyasu's son dropped his childhood name, Takechiyo (竹千代), and assumed the name Hidetada. He was named the heir of the Tokugawa family, being the eldest surviving son of Ieyasu, and his favorite (since Ieyasu's eldest son had been previously executed, and his second son was adopted by Hideyoshi while still an infant). In 1593, Hidetada returned to his father's side.

In 1590, Hidetada married O-Hime (1585–1591), daughter of Oda Nobukatsu and adopted daughter of Toyotomi Hideyoshi. O-Hime died in 1591, and was given the posthumous Buddhist name Shunshoin. In 1595, Hidetada married Oeyo, daughter of Azai Nagamasa and adopted daughter of Toyotomi Hideyoshi.  Their wedding was held in Fushimi Castle.

Military achievements (1593–1605)
In 1595, Hidetada married Oeyo of the Oda clan and they had two sons, Tokugawa Iemitsu and Tokugawa Tadanaga. They also had several daughters, one of whom, Senhime, married twice. The other daughter, Kazuko hime, married Emperor Go-Mizunoo (of descent from the Fujiwara clan).

Knowing his death would come before his son Toyotomi Hideyori came of age, Hideyoshi named five regents—one of whom was Hidetada's father, Ieyasu—to rule in his son's place. Hideyoshi hoped that the bitter rivalry among the regents would prevent any one of them from seizing power. But after Hideyoshi died in 1598 and Hideyori became nominal ruler, the regents forgot all vows of eternal loyalty and were soon vying for control of the nation. Tokugawa Ieyasu was one of the strongest of the five regents, and began to rally around himself an Eastern faction. A Western faction rallied around Ishida Mitsunari. The two factions clashed at the Battle of Sekigahara in 1600. Ieyasu won decisively, which set the stage for Tokugawa rule.

Hidetada had led 16,000 of his father's men in a campaign to contain the Western-aligned Uesugi clan in Shinano. Ieyasu then ordered Hidetada to march to Sekigahara in anticipation of the decisive battle against the Western faction. But the Sanada clan managed to tie down Hidetada's force, so he arrived too late to assist in his father's narrow but decisive victory. Hidetada and Ieyasu's relationship never recovered. On 3 December 1601, Hidetada's first son, was born to a young maiden from Kyoto named Onatsu. In September 1602, Chōmaru fell ill and died; his funeral was held at Zōjō-ji temple in Shibe.

In 1603 Emperor Go-Yōzei granted Ieyasu the title of shōgun. Thus Hidetada became the heir to the shogunate.

Shōgun (1605–1623)
To avoid his predecessor's fate, Ieyasu established a dynastic pattern soon after becoming shogun by abdicating in favor of Hidetada in 1605. Ieyasu retained significant power until his death in 1616; but Hidetada nevertheless assumed a role as formal head of the bakufu bureaucracy.

Much to the dismay of Ieyasu, in 1612, Hidetada engineered a marriage between Sen, Ieyasu's favorite granddaughter, and Toyotomi Hideyori, who was living as a commoner in Osaka Castle with his mother. When this failed to quell Hideyori's intrigues, Ōgosho Ieyasu and Shogun Hidetada brought an army to Osaka. 

In 1614-1615, at Siege of Osaka, father and son once again disagreed on how to conduct this campaign against the recalcitrant Toyotomi forces in Osaka. In the ensuing siege Hideyori and his mother were forced to commit suicide. Even Hideyori's infant son (Kunimatsu), that he had with a concubine, was not spared. Only Sen was spared; she later remarried and had a new family.

After Ieyasu's death in 1616, Hidetada took control of the bakufu. He strengthened the Tokugawa hold on power by improving relations with the Imperial court. To this end he married his daughter Kazuko to Emperor Go-Mizunoo. The product of that marriage, a girl, eventually succeeded to the throne of Japan to become Empress Meishō. The city of Edo was also heavily developed under his reign.

Ogosho (1623–1632)

In Genna 9 (1623), Hidetada resigned the government to his eldest son and heir, Tokugawa Iemitsu. Like his father before him, Hidetada became Ōgosho or retired shōgun, and retained effective power. He enacted draconian anti-Christian measures, which Ieyasu had only considered: he banned Christian books, forced Christian daimyōs to commit suicide, ordered other Christians to apostatize under penalty of death; and executed fifty-five Christians (both Japanese and foreign) who refused to renounce Christianity or to go into hiding, by burning, along with their children, in Nagasaki in 1628.

Ōgosho Hidetada died in Kan'ei 9, on the 24th day of the 1st month (March 14, 1632). His ashes were ceremoniously laid to rest in the Taitoku-in Mausoleum in Edo.

Honours
Senior First Rank (March 30, 1632; posthumous)

Eras 
The years in which Hidetada was shōgun are more specifically identified by more than one era name or nengō.
 Keichō  (1596–1615)
 Genna   (1615–1624)

Family

Parents

Siblings (Mother side)

Wives and Concubines

Children

Adopted Daughters
 Toyotomi Sadako (1593–1658) daughter of Toyotomi Hidekatsu with Oeyo, later married Kujō Yukiie and had 2 Sons: Nijō Yasumichi and Kujō Michifusa.(Hidekatsu was Oeyo's former husband who died in Japanese Invasions of Korea)
 Chiyohime (1597–1649), daughter of Ogasawara Hidemasa and Toku-hime (Tokuhime was daughter of Matsudaira Nobuyasu) and married Hosokawa Tadatoshi had 1 son: Hosokawa Mitsunao of Kumamoto Domain
 Katsuhime (1618–1678), daughter of Senhime with Honda Tadatoshi and married Ikeda Mitsumasa, had 1 son and 1 daughter: Ikeda Tsunamasa, Torihime
 Kamehime (1617–1681), daughter of Katsuhime with Matsudaira Tadanao and married Takamatsu no Miya Yoshihito-Shinnō
 Kisahime (1598–1656), daughter of Yūki Hideyasu and married Mōri Hidenari had 1 son: Mori Tsunanori of Chōshū Domain
 Binhime (1607–1652) daughter of Okudaira Iemasa of Utsunomiya Domain and married Horio Tadaharu had 1 daughter married Ishikawa Kadokatsu
 Furuhime (1607–1659), daughter of Ikeda Terumasa with Tokuhime (Tokuhime was Hidetada's sister) and married Date Tadamune had 2 sons and 1 daughter: Torachiyo, Date Mitsumune, and Nabehime married Tachibana Tadashige
 Tsuruhime (d. 1672), daughter of Sakakibara Yasumasa and married Ikeda Toshitaka of Himeji Domain had 1 son: Ikeda Mitsumasa
 Hisahime (1606–1628) daughter of Matsudaira Tadayoshi of Sekiyado Domain and married Kuroda Tadayuki of Fukuoka Domain
 Takashi-ho-in (1602–1656), daughter of Gamō Hideyuki with Furihime (Hidetada's younger sister) and married Kato Tadahiro of Kumamoto Domain had 1 son: Katō Mitsuhiro
 daughter of Okada Mototsugu and married Soma Toshitane of Soma Nakamura Domain

Ancestry

See also
Aoi Tokugawa Sandai, a TV series about the life of Hidetada.

Notes

References
 Screech, Timon. (2006). Secret Memoirs of the Shoguns:  Isaac Titsingh and Japan, 1779–1822. London: RoutledgeCurzon.  
 Titsingh, Isaac. (1822). Illustrations of Japan.  London: Ackerman.
 Titsingh, Isaac, ed. (1834). [Siyun-sai Rin-siyo/Hayashi Gahō, 1652], Nipon o daï itsi ran; ou,  Annales des empereurs du Japon  Paris: Oriental Translation Fund of Great Britain and Ireland.
 Totman, Conrad. (1967). Politics in the Tokugawa bakufu, 1600–1843. Cambridge: Harvard University Press.
 Wilson, Richard L. (1985).  Ogata Kenzan (1663–1743) (PhD thesis/dissertation). Lawrence, Kansas: University of Kansas.   OCLC 19111312

1581 births
1632 deaths
16th-century Japanese people
17th-century shōguns
Tokugawa shōguns
Tokugawa clan
People of Azuchi–Momoyama-period Japan
People of Edo-period Japan